Zyad Farag (born 8 February 2002) is an Egyptian professional footballer who plays as a midfielder for Al Masry.

Career statistics

Club

Notes

References

2002 births
Living people
Egyptian footballers
Association football midfielders
Al Masry SC players
Egyptian Premier League players